Myrionema may refer to:
 Myrionema (hydrozoan), a genus of hydrozoans in the family Eudendriidae
 Myrionema (alga), a genus of algae in the family Chordariaceae